Phylidorea squalens is a species of cranefly in the family Limoniidae

References 

 http://zipcodezoo.com/Animals/P/Phylidorea_squalens/

External links 
 http://www.commanster.eu/commanster/Insects/Flies/SpFlies/Phylidorea.squalens.html

Limoniidae
Insects described in 1838